Tetrazoles are a class of synthetic organic heterocyclic compound, consisting of a 5-member ring of four nitrogen atoms and one carbon atom. The name tetrazole also refers to the parent compound with formula CH2N4, of which three isomers can be formulated.

Structure and bonding 
Three isomers of the parent tetrazole exist, differing in the position of the double bonds: 1H-, 2H-, and 5H-tetrazole. The 1H- and 2H- isomers are tautomers, with the equilibrium lying on the side of 1H-tetrazole in the solid phase. In the gas phase, 2H-tetrazole dominates. These isomers can be regarded as aromatic, with 6 π-electrons, while the 5H-isomer is nonaromatic.

Synthesis
1H-Tetrazole was first prepared by the reaction of anhydrous hydrazoic acid and hydrogen cyanide under pressure.  Treatment of organic nitriles with sodium azide in the presence of iodine or silica-supported sodium bisulfate as a heterogeneous catalyst enables an advantageous synthesis of 5-substituted 1H-tetrazoles. Another method is the deamination of 5-aminotetrazole, which can be commercially obtained or prepared in turn from aminoguanidine.

2-Aryl-2H-tetrazoles are synthesized by a [3+2] cycloaddition reaction between an aryl diazonium and trimethylsilyldiazomethane.

Uses 
There are several pharmaceutical agents which are tetrazoles. Tetrazoles can act as bioisosteres for carboxylate groups because they have similar pKa and are deprotonated at physiological pH. Angiotensin II receptor blockers — such as losartan and candesartan, often are tetrazoles.
A well-known tetrazole is dimethyl thiazolyl diphenyl tetrazolium bromide (MTT). This tetrazole is used in the MTT assay to quantify the respiratory activity of live cells culture, although it generally kills the cells in the process. Some tetrazoles can also be used in DNA assays. Studies suggest VT-1161 and VT-1129 are a potential potent antifungal drugs as they disturbs fungal enzymatic function but not human enzymes.

Some tetrazole derivatives with high energy have been investigated as high performance explosives as a replacement for TNT and also for use in high performance solid rocket propellant formulations. These include the azidotetrazolate salts of nitrogen bases.

Other tetrazoles are used for their explosive or combustive properties, such as tetrazole itself and 5-aminotetrazole, which are sometimes used as a component of gas generators in automobile airbags. Tetrazole based energetic materials produce high-temperature, non-toxic reaction products such as water and nitrogen gas, and have a high burn rate and relative stability, all of which are desirable properties. The delocalization energy in tetrazole is 209 kJ/mol.

1H-Tetrazole and 5-(benzylthio)-1H-tetrazole (BTT) are widely used as acidic activators of the coupling reaction in oligonucleotide synthesis.

Related heterocycles
 Triazoles, analogs with three nitrogen atoms
 Pentazole, the analog with five nitrogen atoms (strictly speaking, an inorganic homocycle, not a heterocycle)
 Oxatetrazole
 Thiatetrazole

References

 
Simple aromatic rings
Nitrogen heterocycles
Azoles